Lambertellinia is a genus of fungi in the family Sclerotiniaceae. This is a monotypic genus, containing the single species Lambertellinia scutuloides.

References

Sclerotiniaceae
Monotypic Ascomycota genera